Phorytocarpais is a genus of mites in the family Parasitidae.

Species
 Phorytocarpais americanus (Berlese, 1906)     
 Phorytocarpais beta (Oudemans & Voigts, 1904)     
 Phorytocarpais casulatus Athias-Henriot, 1980     
 Phorytocarpais caucatus Athias-Henriot, 1980     
 Phorytocarpais cynaratus Athias-Henriot, 1979     
 Phorytocarpais fimetorum (Berlese, 1903)     
 Phorytocarpais frater Athias-Henriot, 1980     
 Phorytocarpais grandis Athias-Henriot, 1980     
 Phorytocarpais nonus Athias-Henriot, 1980     
 Phorytocarpais scapulatus Athias-Henriot, 1980     
 Phorytocarpais singulus Athias-Henriot, 1979

References

Parasitidae